Claudio Cafiero (born September 19, 1989) is an Italian professional football player who currently plays for S.S.D. Pomezia Calcio.

On 16 August 2016 he was signed by Lupa Roma F.C. on loan.

References

External links
 
 

1989 births
Living people
Italian footballers
Association football defenders
F.C. Crotone players
A.S.D. Victor San Marino players
A.S.D. Cassino Calcio 1924 players
Latina Calcio 1932 players
S.E.F. Torres 1903 players
Lupa Roma F.C. players
L'Aquila Calcio 1927 players
A.S.D. Francavilla players
S.S.D. Città di Campobasso players
Serie D players
Serie C players